Musical events of the year 1646 in music:

Events 
Luigi Rossi is invited to Paris by Cardinal Mazarin.

Classical music 
Giovanni Battista Granata – , a collection of music for the treble guitar, published in Bologna.
Andreas Hammerschmidt – Part IV of the Musicalische Andachten

Opera 
Francesco Cavalli –  (lost), with libretto by Giovanni Francesco Busenello
Giacinto Andrea Cicognini – Il Celio

Births 
July 29 – Johann Theile, composer (died 1724)
date unknown – Juan de Araujo, musician and composer (died 1712)

Deaths 
September 11 – Johann Stobäus, composer (born 1580)
September 24 – Duarte Lobo, composer (born c. 1545)
October 3 – Virgilio Mazzocchi, Italian composer of sacred vocal music (born 1597)
date unknown – Wojciech Dębołęcki, writer and composer (born 1585)
Manuel Machado, Portuguese harpist and composer of cantigas and romances
Johann Vierdanck, German composer, violinist and cornetist (buried 1 April) (b. 1605)

References

 
Music
17th century in music
Music by year